Rocky Peak Ridge is the twentieth highest peak in the High Peaks Region of the Adirondack Park of New York, United States. The name of the mountain is due to its geology, a rocky ridge to the east of the better known Giant Mountain. The long, bare ridge is unusual in the Adirondacks; it resulted from the last great forest fire in the region, in 1913.

Ascents  
There are two trails leading to the top of the peak. One trail, leaving from the town of New Russia, is about a ten-mile round trip with a few, steep rock scrambles along the way. The more commonly used trail splits from the Giant Mountain Trail at about 0.1 mile below Giant's summit. The trail descends steeply from Giant for 0.4 mile and then goes gently uphill for 0.8 mile.

Views  
Rocky Peak Ridge provides unobstructed 360-degree views from the highpoint and many lookouts along the ridgeline. The views of Giant Mountain, the Great Range, Dix Mountain Wilderness, Lake Champlain and Vermont are spectacular and well worth the 1.2 mile hike from just below the summit of Giant.

References

External links
 
 PeakBagger.com: Rocky Peak Ridge
 SummitPost.org: Rocky Peak Ridge

Mountains of Essex County, New York
Adirondack High Peaks
U.S. Route 9
Mountains of New York (state)